The United States Army Recruiting and Retention College (RRC), located at Fort Knox, Kentucky, serves as the United States Army training brigade responsible for providing U.S. Army officers and non-commissioned officers (NCOs) with the skills, knowledge, and techniques to conduct recruiting and career counselor duties for the United States Army and Army Reserve at the company, battalion, brigade, and headquarters levels.

History 

On July 1, 1983, the United States Army Recruiting and Retention School (RRS) was activated at Fort Benjamin Harrison, Indiana as the fifth Army school managed by the United States Army Institute of Personnel and Resource Management (USAIPRM); prior to the school's activation, Army recruiting and retention courses were taught by the United States Army Adjutant General School also at Fort Benjamin Harrison. In August 1984, the Army reorganized USAIPRM as the United States Army Soldier Support Institute (USASSI) where it would oversee eight schools responsible for the training of all Army personnel, finance, music, and recruiting and retention Soldiers. In 1991, the United States Congress approved the 1991 Base Realignment and Closure Commission list recommending Fort Benjamin Harrison be closed and the units located there moved to other military bases; by October 1995, USASSI and its associated schools were moved to Fort Jackson, South Carolina.

In March 2014, the Army made a decision to relocate the RRS to Fort Knox, Kentucky, in order to improve synergy between the U.S. Army Recruiting Command (USAREC) and the RRS, enhance the training needs of recruiters, better support the development of recruiting doctrine and curriculum development, and reduce Army Career Management Field (CMF) 79 institutional training sites from three to two. The move was estimated to save the Army more than $14 million a year in travel and training costs by repurposing the headquarters buildings, barracks, and dining facilities previously used by the deactivated 3d Brigade Combat Team, 1st Infantry Division into a new campus for the RRS.

On October 1, 2016, the RRS Headquarters Company was activated to provide better mission command support to the Soldiers and civilians working at the RRS. One year later on October 1, 2017, the RRS was renamed the United States Army Recruiting and Retention College (RRC) as part of its incorporation under the Army University system, which integrated all of the Army's professional military education institutions under a single educational structure modeled after many civilian university systems.

Accreditation 
The RRC is one of 27 Army Centers of Excellence (CoE), Colleges, and Schools under the Army University system and is accredited by the United States Army Training and Doctrine Command (TRADOC) Quality Assurance Office to provide military training and issue diplomas and transcripts to military and civilian students. It is one of only 45 U.S. military and government training institutions to earn civilian accreditation from the Council on Occupational Education (CoE).

Courses at the RRC have been evaluated by the American Council on Education (ACE) for awarding of civilian college credit hours towards undergraduate degrees and certificates based on ACE guidelines, and the RRC has Continuing Education Degree Program agreements with several colleges and universities to provide course graduates with accelerated degree plans and college credit hours towards associate's, bachelor's, and master's degrees from those institutions.

Campus 
The RRC campus is made up of 12 buildings located on 80 acres (326,987 m2) at Fort Knox, Kentucky, which house the executive, academic, and administrative offices, 36 classrooms, dining facility, and student housing. The campus layout provides students with less than a 10-minute walk between their housing, classrooms, dining facility, and physical fitness training areas, thus reducing the need for a vehicle while attending. Several buildings are named after historic people or events from the 3d Brigade Combat Team, 1st Infantry Division units that previously used them.

 Tempesta Hall is the main academic and administrative building on the RRC campus. It houses the RRC executive, administrative, and support offices and 26 classrooms of various sizes and configurations that allow them to hold between 16 and 40 students each. The building is named after U.S. Army Staff Sergeant Anthony Tempesta, who was posthumously awarded the Distinguished Service Cross for his actions during World War II.
 The RRC Annex building, located next to Tempesta Hall, is a multipurpose facility with two modular classrooms spaces that can each be configured to hold between 24 to 96 students using retractable wall panels, two standard 16-student classrooms, and offices for the RRC's academic department leaders and instructors. The building's top floor is the headquarters of the U.S. Army Medical Recruiting Brigade.
 The RRC Student Housing Complex and Balcombe Barracks Complex consist of nine barracks buildings that can house nearly 900 students. The rooms meet the U.S. Department of Defense's (DoD) "1+1 Standard," which consists of a two-bedroom apartment with separate bedrooms and closets for each occupant and a shared bathroom, kitchenette, and common area. The RRC Complex has upgraded rooms including a four-burner stove with oven, full-size refrigerator/freezer, and a dining table with four chairs.
 The Cantigny Dining Facility provides students with meals while attending courses at the RRC. The facility is managed by the Fort Knox Logistics Readiness Center and is operated and staffed by a government contractor. It is located between the student housing complexes and classroom buildings and is open nearly year round regardless of weather conditions to provide meals to students attending the RRC as well as other schools and training courses at Fort Knox. The building is named in honor of the Battle of Cantigny, which was the first major combat engagement for both the American Expeditionary Forces and 1st Infantry Division Soldiers during World War I.
The Natcher Physical Fitness Center, located across from the RRC Annex building, provides physical fitness facilities for the RRC. While not considered part of the RRC campus, it is used extensively by the RRC to conduct the Army Combat Fitness Test (ACFT) and daily physical fitness activities for both students and RRC Soldiers. The center is managed and operated by the Fort Knox Family and Morale, Welfare, and Recreation office and houses three full-court basketball/volleyball courts, two glass-enclosed racquetball courts, strength training area, aerobic exercise room, and elevated indoor track. Outside is a 400 meter rubber-surface running track, 1-mile gravel-surface running trail, athletic field, pull-up bars, obstacle course, and outdoor fitness equipment.

Organization 
More than 110 soldiers, Department of the Army (DA) Civilians, and U.S. government contractor employees work in one of two academic departments, noncommissioned officer academy, Headquarters Company, and 13 staff divisions. The RRC trains approximately 6,500 Soldiers and civilians each year in one of 16 in-person or online courses covering recruiting, career counseling, staff functions, recruiting leadership, unit command, and executive leadership.

The RRC is commanded by a Colonel who serves as the institution's Commandant and leads its educational and operational activities in accordance with Army regulations and policies. The Commandant is assisted by a Command Sergeant Major who serves as both the RRC senior enlisted advisor and as Commandant of the RRC Noncommissioned Officer Academy (NCOA), a civilian Dean/Chief Academic Officer that serves as the primary academic advisor and manages the eight academic support divisions, and a Lieutenant Colonel that serves as the RRC chief of staff (CofS) and primary military advisor and manages five administrative support divisions and provides oversight to the RRC Headquarters Company.

Senior recruiting and career counselor NCOs that have demonstrated exceptional performance in multiple recruiting or retention leadership positions are screened by RRC and USAREC leadership for selection as instructors. Selected Soldiers will serve a two to three-year assignment as an instructor teaching one to three individual courses, and may volunteer to serve an additional one to two years in an academic or administrative support position.

Academic Departments 
Two academic departments - the Recruiting Department and the Retention Department - are responsible for the instruction of nearly all courses taught at the RRC and daily management of instructors and students. Each department is led by a Sergeant Major and is divided into instructional divisions responsible for the teaching of specific courses, with the Dean/Chief Academic Officer providing educational oversight and the CofS providing military oversight to the departments.

Recruiting Department 

The Recruiting Department provides instruction to Army Soldiers selected for recruiting duty or holding the recruiting military occupational specialty (MOS) code 79R (Recruiter), and is led by a Sergeant Major from the Army recruiting career field. The department is divided into five instructional divisions led by either a First Sergeant or Master Sergeant, with each division's instructors teaching specific recruiting courses to students.

Army Recruiter Course (ARC) 
Divisions 1, 2, and 3 teach the Army Recruiter Course (ARC), a seven-week basic qualification course taught to all Soldiers selected for recruiting duty, and is the largest course taught at the RRC. The ARC teaches students the principles of adaptive leadership, eligibility, technology systems, interpersonal communications, Army programs, time management, prospecting, interviewing, and processing. Students must graduate from this course to be awarded the Army Recruiter Badge, Army Skill Qualification Identifier (SQI) code 4 (Non-Career Recruiter) and be authorized to perform recruiting duties.

Recruiting Station Commander Course (RSCC) 
Division 4 teaches the Recruiting Station Commander Course (RSCC), a four-week basic leadership course managed by the RRC Noncommissioned Officer Academy (NCOA) and taught to recruiting NCOs who volunteer to change their MOS code to 79R and permanently remain on recruiting duty in a leadership or staff capacity. Students must graduate from this course to change their MOS to 79R, be awarded the Army Additional Skill Identifier (ASI) code V6 (Station Commander), and be authorized to lead recruiters and manage recruiting offices.

Recruiter Live Fire Exercise (RLF) 
The Recruiting Live Fire Exercise (RLF) is a one-week capstone exercise conducted on the final week of each ARC and RSCC class that sends students to Army recruiting station throughout the United States to execute what they have learned through practical application in a real-world environment. The ARC and RSCC classes are combined, with RSCC students assigned five to eight ARC students each and given responsibility and task of managing the ARC students as if they were recruiters working at that local recruiting station, including area research, missioning, prospecting, lead generation, and processing. The RLF is managed by the RRC's Futures, Assessment, Integration, and Research Division (FAIR) with ARC and RSCC instructors supervising and evaluating the students throughout the week. Any real-world leads or applicants that students generate are handed over to the local recruiting station for further processing and enlistment.

Advanced Courses 
Division 5 teaches six advanced recruiting and recruiting leadership courses to recruiting officers and NCOs:
 The Health Care Recruiting Course (HCRC) is a three-week advanced qualification course that trains selected recruiting NCOs and Army Medical Department (AMEDD) officers on recruiting and processing medical professionals into direct commissioned officer positions within AMEDD. Recruiting NCO's must have graduated from ARC before attending this course, and AMEDD officers must graduate from this course in order to be awarded the Army Recruiter Badge for permanent wear on their uniforms. All recruiting personnel must graduate from this course in order to be awarded the Army ASI code 4N (Health Care Recruiter) and be authorized to perform health care recruiting duties.
 The Guidance Counselor/Operations Course (GCOC) is a four-week advanced qualification course that trains selected recruiting NCOs to work in recruiting battalion and brigade operations sections or as Army liaisons at Military Entrance Processing Stations (MEPS). Prospective students must complete a three-week preparatory program consisting of on-the-job training with operations NCOs at an Army recruiting battalion and Army guidance counselors at a MEPS prior to attending. Recruiting personnel must graduate from this course in order to be awarded the Army ASI code V7 (Guidance Counselor) and authorized to process enlistment paperwork for individuals joining the Army and Army Reserve.
 The Health Care Recruiting Officer-In-Charge Course (HCROICC) is a five-week distributed learning leadership course that trains selected AMEDD officer recruiters on recruiting office management. AMEDD officers selected to serve as Army health care recruiting station officers-in-charge (OIC) must attend the course within their first year of assignment to the role; officers not selected for an OIC role may attend on a space-available basis or as directed by their unit.
 The Company Executive Officer Course (COXOC) is a two-week leadership course that trains recruiting company executive officers (XO) on the administrative, technical, and tactical skills necessary to successfully perform the role in a recruiting company. Officers must graduate from this course to be awarded the Army Recruiter Badge for permanent wear on their uniforms.
 The Recruiting Company Commander/First Sergeant Course (RCCFSC) is a three-week leadership course that trains officers selected for recruiting company commander and first sergeant positions. The course focuses on training the company commanders and first sergeants together on the unique roles and functions of leading and managing an Army recruiting company, including the responsibilities of the company commander and first sergeant within Army recruiting, overcoming the challenges of leading geographically-dispersed Soldiers, and the importance of working together as a command team to achieve the mission. Officers must graduate from this course to be awarded the Army Recruiter Badge for permanent wear on their uniforms, and both officers and recruiting NCOs must graduate from this course to be assigned to recruiting company command and first sergeant positions.
 The Recruiting Pre-Command Course (PCC) is a two-week leadership course that trains Colonels and Lieutenant Colonels selected for recruiting battalion or brigade command on the history, structure, and functions of Army recruiting. During week two of the course, the officers are joined by their unit's Command Sergeant Major to help develop their working relationship before assuming command.  A one- or two-day executive version of this course is taught by request to general officers, Senior Executive Service civilians, and senior Army civilian leadership. Incoming commanders and general officers must graduate from this course to be awarded the Army Recruiter Badge for permanent wear on their uniforms; those that do not graduate may only wear the badge on their uniform during their assignment to USAREC, and must remove it upon transfer to a non-recruiting assignment.

Retention Department 

The Retention Department provides instruction to Army Soldiers selected for career counselor duty or holding the career counselor MOS codes 79S (Career Counselor) and 79V (Retention and Transition NCO), and is led by a Sergeant Major from the Army retention career field. The department has one instructional division led by a Master Sergeant and several instructors teaching retention courses to students.

 The Career Counselor Course (CCC) is a nine-week basic qualification course for NCOs who volunteer to permanently remain on career counselor duty in the Army. Students must graduate from this course in order to change their MOS to 79S, be awarded the Army Career Counselor Badge, and be authorized to perform career counselor duties and lead retention NCOs.
 The Transition Noncommissioned Officer Course (TNCO) is a two-week qualification course for NCOs who volunteer to permanently remain on career counselor duty in the Army Reserve. Army Reserve students must graduate from this course in order to change their MOS to 79V and be authorized to perform career counselor duties and lead retention NCOs in Army Reserve units.
 The Department of the Army Retention Training (DART) is a one-week course taught by RRC retention mobile training teams at U.S. Army installations around the world. The course provides training to Soldiers selected to serve as unit retention NCOs at the company and battalion levels. The course does not qualify Soldiers to serve as career counselors or wear the Army Career Counselor Badge, but Soldiers must graduate from this course in order to later volunteer to become career counselors and change their MOS to 79S.

Noncommissioned Officer Academy 
The RRC Noncommissioned Officer Academy (NCOA) provides leadership training to recruiting and retention NCOs selected for promotion to Sergeant First Class and recruiting NCOs that have volunteered to permanently remain on recruiting duty. The NCOA is led by the RRC Command Sergeant Major who serves as the Academy's Commandant and a First Sergeant that serves as the Deputy Commandant and provides day-to-day management of the Academy's courses, instructors, and students.

Senior Leader Course 
The NCOA teaches the Army Senior Leader Course (SLC), a three-week Army MOS-specific leadership course that trains recruiting and career counselor NCOs selected for promotion to Sergeant First Class. Soldiers selected for promotion to Sergeant First Class must graduate from this course in order to be promoted. The course materials are a combination of Army leadership lessons developed by the United States Army Sergeants Major Academy (USASMA) and MOS-specific lessons developed by the RRC that train students to lead at the platoon, company, and battalion levels. 

The NCOA also provides oversight of the Recruiting Station Commander Course (RSCC), with NCOA instructors certified to teach both SLC and RSCC courses.

Headquarters Company 
The Headquarters Company (HHC) is responsible for the health, morale, welfare, training, discipline, conduct, and combat readiness of Soldiers assigned to the RRC. Commanded by a Captain who is assisted by a First Sergeant and several military and civilian staff members, the HHC is responsible for providing mission command, logistics, military justice, training and readiness, administrative support, and quality of life functions for the RRC's Soldiers and students.

Staff Divisions 
There are 13 staff divisions that manage the academic support and administrative support functions of the RRC. The divisions are split between academic support divisions managed by the Dean/Chief Academic Officer, and administrative support divisions managed by a Lieutenant Colonel that serves as the RRC Chief of Staff.

Academic Support Divisions 
The Dean/Chief Academic Officer manages eight academic support divisions providing curriculum development, training management, instructor training, and faculty support to the RRC, and doctrine and proponent support for the RRC and Army Reserve retention courses taught at the 83rd United States Army Reserve Readiness Training Center (ARRTC) located at Fort Knox, and Army National Guard recruiting and retention courses taught at the Strength Maintenance Training Center (SMTC) located at Camp Robinson, Arkansas.

 The Quality Assurance Office (QAO) is responsible for ensuring the RRC complies with all accreditation requirements, as well as conduct surveys, consolidate student performance data, and providing recommendations to the Commandant and Dean on changes to ensure the RRC stays in compliance with TRADOC and Army Regulations.
 The Training Development Division (TDD) is responsible for the development of all courseware taught or provided to students, including Programs of Instruction (POI), syllabus, lesson plans, presentations, handouts, examinations, and assessments. The division also monitors for changes in Army and USAREC regulations and updates courseware as appropriate, and provides regular interaction with instructional division chiefs to ensure courseware is being taught according to standard.
 The Training Management Division (TMD) is responsible for the tracking of student enrollment, projection of training allocations and funding, updating of students military training records, and issuing of diplomas. The division's chief also serves as the RRC Registrar.
The Distributed Learning Division (DLD) is responsible for the development and implementation of all distance learning courses taught at the RRC. The division is also responsible for monitoring for and recommending changes to online training methods, equipment, and software.

 The Faculty and Staff Development Division (FSDD) is responsible for the training of instructors and staff members assigned to the RRC, maintaining the RRC Instructor Certification Program and Faculty Development Recognition Program, and administering the RRC Instructor of the Quarter and Instructor of the Year competitions. The FSDD teaches or manages five courses:
 The Common Faculty Development-Instructor Course (CFD-IC) is a two-week basic qualification course for Soldiers and DA civilians selected to serve as instructors. Students must graduate from this course in order to be awarded the Army SQI code 8 (Instructor) and be authorized to begin instructor duties. Upon completing the RRC Instructor Certification Program new instructors are considered certified and able to teach without supervision. After reaching 80 hours of classroom instruction, instructors are eligible to be awarded the Basic Army Instructor Badge (BAIB).
 The Common Faculty Development-Developer Course (CFD-DC) is a two-week advanced qualification course for Soldiers and civilians selected to serve as training developers. Students must graduate from this course in order to be awarded the Army SQI code 2 (Training Developer) and be authorized to create, edit, and publish training and educational materials for students attending Army schools.
 The Training and Education Development Middle Manager Course (TEDMMC) is a one-week advanced course for Soldiers and civilians serving in a training development or management role. The course introduces students to the management of the training development process and personnel while building upon the knowledge previously taught in CFD-DC and the student's own experience. Students must have graduated from the CFD-DC prior to attending this course.
The Master Trainer Course (MTC) is a two-week advanced qualification course for Soldiers selected to serve as a Master Trainer in a recruiting battalion, brigade, or at command level. The course teaches students how to effectively evaluate recruiting teams, stations, and companies, evaluate the application and development of needs-based training using the Assess, Develop, Design, Implement, and Evaluate (ADDIE) process, manage Soldier training though the Army Digital Training Management System (DTMS) and Army Learning Management System (ALMS), manage a unit's schools program, and plan and execute training events. Soldiers must graduated from this course in order to serve in a Master Trainer role.
The Advanced Instructor Course (AIC) is an annual four-week joint advanced education program managed by the FSDD and conducted by the University of Louisville's (UofL) College of Education and Human Development, Department of Educational Leadership, Evaluation and Organizational Development, for selected RRC Soldiers and DA civilians; other Soldiers and DA civilians stationed at Fort Knox that are serving in a training or instructional role may attend on a space-available basis. UofL professors provide students with graduate-level instruction on adult learning theory, instructional methods, curriculum development and design, training evaluation, and the organizational change process. Up to 24 students are selected for the annual program, and applicants must have a bachelor's degree from a regionally-accredited university to apply. Selected students will be enrolled at UofL and awarded 12 graduate credit hours towards a Master's degree in Human Resources and Organization Development upon completion of the course.
The Doctrine Division is responsible for the development and implementation of all recruiting regulations, manuals, and other technical documents for USAREC. The division works closely with TDD as the information and guidance provided by Doctrine is used by TDD personnel to develop training materials. The division also serves as the point of contact for all references to Army recruiting in Army regulations.
The Futures, Assessment, Integration, and Research Division (FAIR) is responsible for conducting research and testing on new recruiting methods and concepts, as well as management of the Recruiter Live Fire capstone exercise. The division also provides training support to foreign military partners as requested by Army leadership.
The Personnel Development Division (PDD) is responsible for the development and management of all career management functions for the Army's CMF 79. The division works closely with USAREC, U.S. Army Human Resources Command (HRC), the Army's Deputy Chief of Staff for Personnel (Army G-1), the Chief of the Army Reserve (OCAR), and the Chief of the National Guard Bureau (NGB) on policies and procedures that may affect Army, Army Reserve, and Army National Guard recruiting and retention personnel.

Administrative Support Divisions 
The Chief of Staff (CofS) is responsible for the day-to-day execution of all institutional administrative support functions through direction, supervision, prioritization, and coordination of the student operations and administration, budget, logistics, and information management functions. The CofS also provides oversight to the RRC Headquarters Company and works directly with the RRC Command Sergeant Major and Dean/Chief Academic Officer to ensure coordinated actions across the institution are completed.

There are five administrative support divisions that provide the administrative, logistical, and technical support that allows the RRC to accomplish its mission.

 The Student Operations Division (OPS) manages the daily operations of the RRC, including student in- and out-processing, attendance tracking, dining facility coordination, ceremonial scheduling and support, and mission requirements and tracking. The division also serves as the RRC's International Military Student Office (IMSO), which provides support to international military students attending the RRC and their families while they stay on Fort Knox.
 Student Administrative Services (SAS) manages the qualifications and assignments of students while serving as the liaison between the RRC, HRC, USAREC, Installation Military Personnel Divisions (MPDs), and the Defense Finance and Accounting Service (DFAS). The division works with HRC and USAREC's personnel branch on assignment actions for ARC students and updating of student's personnel records.
 The Information Management Office (IMO) manages all information technology (IT) equipment and requirements for the RRC, and provides IT support to external students and visitors using RRC facilities or external agencies as required.
 The Logistics Management Division (LMD) manages all logistical and budget requirements for the RRC. The division maintains 11 buildings on the RRC campus, issues uniform items to RRC Soldiers and students, performs inventory management functions, and is responsible for all government purchases made by the RRC.
 The Defense Travel Administrator (DTA) serves as the RRC's Defense Travel System (DTS) administrator and its Government Travel Charge Card (GTCC) program coordinator.

Notable Persons and Events 

 Sgt. 1st Class Samuel Woodberry, an ARC instructor, was selected to compete on Season 18 of The Voice, an American reality television series. Woodberry first appeared in during episode 3's blind audition which aired on March 2, 2020, competing under his stage name "Samuel Wilco" and performing Lately by Stevie Wonder. He was selected by judges Nick Jonas and Kelly Clarkson and chose to join Jonas' team. He was eliminated from the competition during episode 8's battle round event which aired on April 6, 2020.
 Sgt. 1st Class Andrew Powell, FSDD noncommissioned officer-in-charge, was the first RRC instructor and the 34th enlisted Soldier in Army history to earn the Master Army Instructor Badge (MAIB). To earn the badge, Powell completed over 480 hours of classroom teaching, graduated three advanced Army training and development courses, received near-perfect scores on eight teaching evaluations and conducted 11 teaching evaluations of other instructors, and developed and presented a lesson plan to a board consisting of senior Army instructors including a MAIB-certified instructor.
 RRC instructors were named the U.S. Army TRADOC Noncommissioned Officer Instructor of the Year - the Army's top enlisted instructor - for a record-setting three consecutive years. Sgt. 1st Class Clifford Hammond, a RSCC instructor, earned the title in 2019; Sgt. 1st Class Heather Rankin, a SLC instructor, earned it in 2020; and Sgt. 1st Class Joel Sanchez, a RSCC instructor, earned it in 2021. The Army's top instructor is selected by TRADOC from the Instructor of the Year for each of the 27 Army CoE's, Colleges, and Schools under the Army University system.

References

External links 

 U.S. Army Recruiting and Retention College
 U.S. Army Recruiting Command
 Army University
 U.S. Army Training and Doctrine Command
 Fort Knox Family and MWR
 U.S. Army Fort Knox

United States Army schools